Charitodoron alcyone is a species of sea snail, a marine gastropod mollusk in the family Charitodoronidae.

Description

Distribution

References

 Lussi (2009). Malacologia Mostra Mondiale 62 (1) : 3-9

External links

Charitodoronidae
Gastropods described in 2009